Alfred de Bathe Brandon (1809 – 22 September 1886) was a 19th-century New Zealand politician.

Early life
Brandon was born in London in 1809; his father was Henry Brandon. He was educated as a lawyer. He took an interest in Edward Gibbon Wakefield's ideas on colonisation and came to Wellington, New Zealand, in 1840 on the London as a cabin passenger.

Political career

Brandon was elected to the Wellington Provincial Council in its first election in 1853. He represented the Wellington Country electorate until 1865, and then the Porirua electorate until the abolition of the provincial governments in October 1876. He served on various Executive Councils (comparable to a cabinet) between 1857 and 1871. He was Provincial Solicitor during the superintendency of Isaac Featherston.

He represented the Wellington Country electorate in Parliament from 1858 to 1860, then the Porirua electorate from 1860 to 1870, then the Wellington Country electorate again from 1871. In 1871, Brandon was challenged by Edward Thomas Gillon. Whilst there was criticism of Brandon not having had a good connection to his electorate, Brandon won with a solid majority. The next election in 1875 was contested by Gillon, Brandon, and J. H. Wallace. Brandon was again successful and received 208 votes versus 141 for Gillon, with Wallace a distant last.

He was one of the staunch provincialists (i.e. he was opposed to the abolition of the provinces).

He was called to the Legislative Council on 5 June 1883 and served until his death.

Outside parliament
Brandon was Crown Prosecutor in Wellington. He was regarded as an expert in conveyancing and in legal drafting. He was on the board of governors of Wellington College. He was director of two insurance companies (Colonial Insurance Co. and Australian Mutual Provident Society). He was president of the Wellington Law Society for a time.

Family and death
His first marriage was to Constance Mary Ann Brandon (née Brandon); they married in London in 1840. His wife died in December 1842 and was buried at the original St Paul's Church, located just behind the present Beehive. She left him an infant son, Eustace Brandon, who became a notable artist.

His second marriage was to Lucy Poole in 1854, and they were to have three sons and four daughters. Brandon died in Wellington on 22 September 1886. His son Alfred Brandon was Mayor of Wellington. His grandson, Alfred Brandon, was a lawyer and military aviator.

Brandon's house near Bulls, Brandon Hall Homestead, was registered by the New Zealand Historic Places Trust (now Heritage New Zealand) in 2005 as a Category II heritage structure. This registration was done with little involvement of the current property owners.

Brandon Street in Wellington Central is named for him.

Notes

References

|- 

|- 

1809 births
1886 deaths
Burials at Bolton Street Cemetery
Members of the New Zealand House of Representatives
Members of the New Zealand Legislative Council
Members of the Wellington Provincial Council
Members of Wellington provincial executive councils
New Zealand MPs for Wellington electorates
19th-century New Zealand politicians